The 1931 Vanderbilt Commodores football team was an American football team that represented Vanderbilt University during the 1931 college football season as a member of the Southern Conference. In their 27th year under head coach Dan McGugin, the Commodores compiled an overall record of 5–4, with a mark of 3–4 in conference play.

Schedule

References

Vanderbilt
Vanderbilt Commodores football seasons
Vanderbilt Commodores football